Henry Brown Amos (24 May 1869 – 22 October 1946) was a Scottish animal rights and vegetarianism activist, and humanitarian.

Biography

Amos was born in Tyninghame, Scotland, on 24 May 1869. He first became interested in vegetarianism in about 1886. He later worked as a drapery salesman and married Ruth Helen Bowker Sharp (1869–1905) on 7 February 1899; they had two children. 

Amos was a member of the Humanitarian League and former member of the RSPCA. In the mid-1890s he was an organizer in the London for the Vegetarian Federal Union. In 1895, he was Hon. Secretary of the Vegetarian Cycling & Athletic Club and was associated with Sidney H. Beard and the Order of the Golden Age (1901–1903). He succeeded Albert Broadbent as Secretary of the Vegetarian Society (1913–1914). In 1915, he published a short pamphlet on cooking vegetarian meals.

Amos founded the League Against Cruel Sports (LACS) in 1924 with Ernest Bell and George Greenwood. The league aimed to abolish the hunting of deer, foxes, hares, otters, and the coursing of hares and rabbits. Amos' letters campaigning against rabbit-coursing in Surrey led to its prohibition in 1924. He organized the Leeds Rodeo Protest Committee the same year. 

Amos became highly critical of the RSPCA because during this time they were unwilling to take action against hunting. His published criticism of the RSPCA caused an internal conflict and because of this Greenwood resigned from LACS in 1927 and Bell resigned in 1931. LACS began producing a monthly journal Cruel Sports which Amos edited. According to E. S. Turner, the journal "criticised the RSPCA for its toleration of fox-hunting, and attacked the Church for sheltering behind the RSPCA." In the 1927 January edition, Amos noted that "little has been done either by religion or education to stem the tide of cruelty involved in hunting." 

In 1935, Amos was jailed briefly for throwing a copy of Henry Stephens Salt's Creed of Kinship through a stained glass window at Exeter Cathedral during evensong. Suffering for years from a bronchial illness, he was eventually forced to retire from his work with the League at the end of 1936.

Amos died in Hendon, north London, on 22 October 1946, at the age of 77; he was survived by two daughters.

Selected publications

The Food Reformer's Year Book and Health Annual  (editor for multiple years, 1909)
Economical, Nourishing Dishes for Times of Stress and How to Cook Them (1915)
Opinions in Favour of Vegetarianism by Leading Temperance Reformers (1919)

References

External links
Two of our favorite 'Leagues'! – Art for the Benefit of Animals – from circa 1924
Letter to Alfred Wallace, 25 January 1906
Letter to Thomas Hardy, 24 August 1926

1869 births
1946 deaths
Anti-hunting activists
Anti-vivisectionists
People associated with the Vegetarian Society
People from East Lothian
Scottish animal rights activists
Scottish drapers
Scottish humanitarians
Scottish vegetarianism activists